is a Japanese highway on the island of Shikoku. The most important artery in Shikoku, it originates at the intersection with Routes 28, 55 and 195 in the prefectural capital of Tokushima (Tokushima Prefecture) and terminates at the intersection with Routes 33, 56, 317, 379, 440 and 494 in Matsuyama (the capital of Ehime Prefecture). Between the terminals, it passes through Naruto (Tokushima Prefecture) and Takamatsu (the capital of Kagawa Prefecture), as well as other regional population centers. Route 11 measures 239.4 km in length.

Route data
Length: 239.4 km (148.8 mi)
Origin: Tokushima (originates at junction with Routes 28, 55 and 195)
Terminus: Matsuyama (ends at Junction with Routes 33, 56, 317, 379, 440 and 494)
Major cities: Naruto, Takamatsu, Sakaide, Marugame, Shikokuchuo, Niihama, Saijo, Toon

History
4 December 1952 - First Class National Highway 11 (from Tokushima to Matsuyama)
1 April 1965 - General National Highway 11 (from Tokushima to Matsuyama)

Overlapping sections
From Tokushima (Kachidoki-bashi intersection) to Matsushige: Route 28
From Naruto (Naruto IC intersection) to Higashikagawa (Takoda intersection): Route 377
In Takamatsu, from Bancho intersection to Nakajincho intersection: Routes 30 and 436

References

011
Roads in Ehime Prefecture
Roads in Kagawa Prefecture
Roads in Tokushima Prefecture